PT Mayora Indah Tbk, or simply called Mayora, is an Indonesian food and beverage company founded on 17 February 1977. The company is recognized as the world's largest coffee candy manufacturer through the Kopiko brand. The company has been listed on the Jakarta Stock Exchange (now Indonesia Stock Exchange) since 4 July 1990. PT Unita Branindo holds 32.93% of shares.

History
Mayora's history dates back to 1948, when a family of Iranian immigrants to Indonesia began making biscuits in their home kitchen, with Marie Biscuits as their first product. In 1976, the family moved to Kampung Bali in Jakarta and began selling Roma brand biscuits. Mayora was formally established in 1977, opening its first factory in Tangerang, west of the Indonesian capital Jakarta. Kopiko, a coffee-flavored candy, was launched in 1982. The company went public in 1990 and expanded its presence to other Asian countries. In November 2017, Mayora's Kopiko snacks were photographed at the International Space Station as part of a Thanksgiving dinner held by astronauts. In 2019, Mayora founder and head Jogi Hendra Atmadja was listed by Forbes as the 10th richest person in Indonesia, with wealth of $3 billion.

Products 

Mayora Group produces several product lines, namely:
 Biscuit: Better, Danisa, Roma Arden, Roma Biskuit Kelapa, Roma Chess Kress, Roma Coffee Joy, Roma Malkist, Roma Marie Gold, Roma Marie Susu, Roma Sari Gandum, Roma Sandwichi, Slai O'lai
 Candy: Kopiko, Kis, Fres (only in the Philippines), Plonk, Tamarin, Juizy Milk
 Wafer: Astor, Beng-Beng, Superstar, Wafello, Zuperrr Keju (Cal Cheese)
 Chocolate: Choki-Choki, Danisa
 Cereal: Energen
 Coffee: Kopi Ayam Merak, Kopiko Brown Coffee, Kopiko Blanca, Kopiko White Mocca, Torabika Duo, Torabika Oke, Torabika 3 in 1, Torabika Jahe Susu, Torabika Cappuccino, Tora Moka, Tora Susu, Kopiko Black, Kopiko Cappuccino, Kopiko L.A (low acid), Kopiko Double Cups, Kopiko Café Mocha, Tora Cafe, Torabika Creamy Latte
 Chocolate Drink: Champion, Drink Beng-Beng
 Porridge: Super Bubur
Milk: Tujuh Kurma
 Instant Noodle: Migelas, Bakmi Mewah, Mie Oven
 Beverage: Kopiko Lucky Day (formerly Kopiko 78 °C, partner between Indonesia, Thailand and the Philippines), Teh Pucuk Harum, Q Guava, Kopiko Iced Blanca, Kopiko Iced Black, Kopiko Iced Brown, Le Minerale
Detergent: Gentle Gen

Mayora also produced several Meiji Seika brands.

Markets

Asia

Middle East

Oceania

Africa

Europe

North America

South America

Controversies

Bankers Trust case
During the 1997-98 Asian financial crisis, when the value of the Indonesian rupiah plummeted, Mayora defaulted on payment obligations to Bankers Trust International. BTI had sold derivative trading contracts to Mayora under International Swaps and Derivatives Association Master Agreements (ISDA Agreements), which contained an arbitration clause. Unwilling to pay its obligations, Mayora sued BTI at South Jakarta District Court, arguing that the agreements were similar to gambling and therefore against Indonesian law. BTI took the case to the London Court of International Arbitration (LCIA), which ruled in favor of BTI, but South Jakarta District Court ruled in favor of Mayora. BTI appealed and the Indonesian Supreme Court upheld the ruling in 2000 and again in 2003, leaving BTI with no further legal recourse.

Free candy for pregnant mothers
According to author Martin Lindstrom's book Brandwashed: Tricks Companies Use To Manipulate Our Minds And Persuade Us To Buy, doctors in the Philippines were given Kopiko candies to hand out to pregnant mothers, and the company later introduced a coffee product which tasted like the candy and became popular with children.

Mineral water factory dispute
In 2014, residents of Pandeglang regency in Indonesia's Banten province began staging protests with the aim of expelling PT Tirta Fresindo Jaya, a subsidiary of Mayora Group, which planned to build a Le Minerale bottled water factory in Cadasari subdistrict that would tap groundwater from natural springs in the area. Residents argued they needed the groundwater for their daily supplies and irrigation needs. The protests culminated in February 2017, when the factory site was attacked, delaying construction activity. Protesters said their aspirations had been ignored by local officials and politicians. In response to initial protests, then-Pandeglang regent Erwin Kurtubi in November 2014 issued a letter to the president director of PT Tirta Fresindo Jaya to "stop investment activities", but the letter had no legal force and the company's activities continued. After Fresindo drilled and tested groundwater in early 2016, locals complained their water reservoirs had dwindled and agricultural irrigation was disrupted. Locals also claimed that a community consent letter for the factory contained falsified signatures. Residents whose names were collected for signatures were each reportedly paid Rp1 million in cash, minus Rp200,000 deducted per person for a mediator. Mayora spokesman Sribugo Suratmo said the community's concerns were unreasonable because the factory had obtained all necessary permits from the local government and would not interfere with surface wells. The company also argued the factory would benefit the local economy and attract further investment.

School children caffeine overdose
On September 30, 2016, 34 high school students at Concord Technical Institute in Cebu City in the Philippines, were briefly hospitalized for caffeine overdose after they consumed free samples of Kopiko 78C bottled drink offered to them. Additionally, some students had reportedly consumed more than three or four bottles each. Doctors said children over 12 should only consume up to 70 milligrams of caffeine daily, whereas each bottle of Kopiko 78C contained 150 milligrams of caffeine. A city councilor commented that the distributor of the free samples may be held liable for giving out coffee to minors.

See also 
 Kopiko (confectionery)

References

External links 
 

 
Companies listed on the Indonesia Stock Exchange
Food and drink companies of Indonesia
Food and drink companies established in 1977
Confectionery companies of Indonesia
Coffee companies
Chocolate companies
Indonesian companies established in 1977
1990 initial public offerings